Des Dickson (born 10 January 1941) is  a former Australian rules footballer who played with Hawthorn in the Victorian Football League (VFL).		
		
"Delicate Des", as he was known ironically, was a tough, rough defender and changing ruckman. Recruited from Golden Square in Bendigo, Dickson received a harsh initiation in his first game in the reserves when he was king hit early on. He vowed that would be how he played the game at that level. He was reported three times late that afternoon.

Reference

External links 
		

Living people
1941 births
Australian rules footballers from Bendigo
Hawthorn Football Club players
Golden Square Football Club players